Recording Industry Foundation in Taiwan (RIT), also known as IFPI Taiwan, formerly IFPI Members Foundation in Taiwan, is the organization that represents the interests of the music industry in Taiwan, and a member of the International Federation of the Phonographic Industry (IFPI).

History
The idea of establishing an IFPI branch in Taiwan was presented in a meeting of 200 representatives of the recording industry, government officials, and the communication industry in February 1986. This led to the organization of 11 domestic record companies in May of that year, and the official establishment of the IFPI Members Foundation in Taiwan on July 1, 1986, widely known by the name IFPI Taiwan. In August 1988, the National Library of Taiwan commissioned IFPI Taiwan with managing ISRC codes in Taiwan, which was assigned the "TW" country code. In November 2008, the organization was renamed as Recording Industry Foundation in Taiwan (RIT).

Charts 
RIT launched the IFPI Taiwan Charts in August 1996 including weekly charts for "Local Top 20", "International Top 10" and "Single Top 10". The charts had their own World Wide Web site, a notable fact for the time. The ranking was based on a random sample of 60 reporting outlets ranking their top-selling titles, a methodology which was challenged by senior label executives as being easy to manipulate. Charts were published for 1997, 1998 and 1999, until they were canceled in August 1999. The reason given for cancellation was that due to the market share of music piracy, the "Chart has not been able to tell the real market situation." The last chart published was on 26 August 1999 (week 32).

Certifications and awards

Sales certificates 
RIT has started providing music recording sales certification in August 1996, at the same time that IFPI Taiwan Charts were established. The levels for certification are:

Prior to 2011, certification was based on physical unis sold:

The highest certification awarded was 21× Platinum, awarded to James Horner's Titanic: Music from the Motion Picture.

Golden Melody Awards 

The Golden Melody Awards is an honor awarded by the Ministry of Culture of Taiwan to recognize outstanding achievement in the Mandarin, Taiwanese, Hakka, and Formosan-languages popular and traditional music industry. It is co-organized by RIT since its inception in 1990.

Hong Kong Asian-Pop Music Festival 

RIT is one of the participants and co-organizers of the Hong Kong Asian-Pop Music Festival (HKAMF) since its inception in 2011, RIT is the organization recommending the Taiwanese participant in the "Asian Next Super Nova Competition".

See also
 List of best-selling albums in Taiwan
 List of music recording certifications

References

External links
 

Organizations established in 1986
Music organizations based in Taiwan
Music industry associations
1986 establishments in Taiwan